The Department of Musicology is an institute of Palacký University Faculty of Philosophy, which conducts research and provides education in the fields of musicology and fine art. While the Faculty of Philosophy dates back to 1576 and has provided education for a number of art theorists, the separate Department of Musicology was established in 1946. It is sited in the building of University Art Centre (former Jesuit College), together with other two art departments of Faculty of Philosophy and two art departments of Faculty of Education.

History
Established in 1573, the Palacký University of Olomouc has a long history of musical scholarship. Olomouc prominently excels in the sphere of classical music (J. H. Gallus, W. A. Mozart, A. Dvořák, G. Mahler, J. Kubelík, E. Destinová, who all spent some part of their lives in Olomouc). Among the Olomouc University graduates are both art theorists (Karel Slavíček, Raphael Georg Kiesewetter, Rudolf Eitelberger, etc.) as well as composers (Pavel Vranický, Pavel Křížkovský, Eduard Schön, Emil Viklický, etc.).

The modern tradition of musicological research and education goes back to 1946 when the Institute of Music Education and Science was established at the Faculty of Philosophy by Robert Smetana (1904–1988). The 1960s and 1970s saw a strong growth of the department (since 1972 led by Vladimír Hudec; however, the institute was  transformed into the Department of Music Education and transferred to the Faculty of Education in 1980 by the decision of the Ministry of Education.

Soon after the fall of the communist régime in 1989, the musicology returned to the ground of Philosophical Faculty, this time as part of the Department of Combined Art Studies. Independent Department of Musicology was renewed in 1992 and through the enthusiasm of excellent professionals grew into a modern academic institution. Since 2002 it is sited in the University Art Centre, former Jesuit College building, together with another two art departments of the Faculty of Philosophy and two art departments of the Faculty of Education.

Current Research Objectives & Other Activities
Research has a fundamental role for the Department. The Department hosts the annual International Musicological Conference (usually late November) and regular public workshops and seminars which are enriched by occasional activities such as conference on Zdeněk Fibich - the 19th Century Middle European Composer held in spring 2010.

The Department's activities embrace a wide variety of modes of research (Regional and Historical Studies, Organology, Critical Edition of Musical Sources, Jazz, Art Rock, Film Music, and so on). Department's research is  supported by a major funds from the European Union and Czech Government (principal among these are the Correspondence of Vítězslav Novák between 1890-1905, Correspondence of Vítězslav Novák between 1906-1949, Zdeněk Fibich’s 19th century Operas, Moravia and the World ...). Department participated on Music Media Training Programme For the Czech Republic (1995 - 1998) and Musical Life in Europe (1997 - 2001). Since 1997 the Department is linked to Saint Cloud State University through the Art and Music in the Czech Republic Programme.

The Department also benefits from a number of collaborative research and educational partnerships, including those with
  Royal Holloway College of University of London in Egham
  University of Bristol
  University of Durham
  University of Copenhagen
  University of Music and Performing Arts, Vienna
  University of Vienna
  Humboldt University of Berlin
  Hochschule für Musik "Carl Maria von Weber"
  University of Halle-Wittenberg
  Université de technologie de Belfort-Montbéliard
  Jean Monnet University
  National University of Ireland, Maynooth
  University of Jyväskylä
  University of Music in Katowice

During last decades the Department provided a forum for a number of academics and visiting lecturers (i.e. Charles Ansbacher, Michael Beckerman, Greg Hurworth, Thomas Christensen, Jobst Fricke, Kenton Frohrip, David Benjamin Levy, Graham Melville-Mason, Scott L. Miller, Christopher Shultis and others).

As part of the University's Faculty of Philosophy, the Department of Musicology offers Bachelor's, Master's and Doctoral degrees in the fields of Musicology and Arts integration.

The Department holds regular concerts and musical festival as well (i.e. festival of contemporary music MusicOlomouc).

Staff

Former Staff and Graduates
During its history department possessed a rather unusual roster of musicologists whose interest covered a great variety of scientific issues (namely Robert Smetana, Vladimír Hudec, Vladimír Gregor, František Kratochvíl, Libor Melkus, Gustav Pivoňka, Josef Schreiber (musicologist), Luděk Zenkl, Pavel Čotek, Ivan Poledňák, Mikuláš Bek, Miroslav K. Černý, Jiří Fukač, Jaroslav Jiránek, Václav Kučera, Stanislav Tesař, Vladimír Tichý, Jiří Sehnal, Miloš Štědroň, Vlastislav Matoušek). Many graduates have become leading scholars and prominent musicians (Leo Jehne, Michal Chrobák, Jan Kapusta, Pavel Klapil, Jiří Pavlica, Stanislav Pecháček).

Contemporary Staff (2014)
 Doc. PhDr. Lenka Křupková, Ph.D. (Head of Department, Guarantor of Musicology)
 Mgr. et Mgr. Martina Stratilková, Ph.D. (Substitute Head of Department, Assistant Professor)
 Mgr. Petr Lyko, Ph.D. (Scientific Secretary, Assistant Professor)
 Mgr. Jan Blüml, Ph.D. (Secretary, Assistant Professor)
 Prof. PhDr. Jan Vičar, CSc. (Professor)
 Prof. PhDr. Alena Burešová, CSc. (Professor Emeritus)
 Prof. PhDr. Jiří Sehnal, CSc. (Professor Emeritus)
 Doc. PhDr. Jiří Kopecký, Ph.D. (Associate Professor)
 Doc. PhDr. Eva Vičarová, Ph.D. (Associate Professor, Guarantor of Art Studies)
 MgA. Marek Keprt, Ph.D. (Assistant Professor)
 PhDr. Ingrid Silná, Ph.D. (Assistant Professor)
 Mgr. Jana Spáčilová, Ph.D. (Assistant Professor)
 Mgr. Alice Ondrejková, Ph.D. (Researcher)

Location and Facilities
Since 2002 the Department of Musicology PhF PU Ol is located in renovated former Jesuits’ Convict, which houses Computer Lab, two large and one small Lecture Halls, three Noise-proof Studios, Chapel, Library and Archive and number of offices, designed to accommodate all its needs in the matter of educational and research activities

Publication Selection

Monographic Studies
Bek, Mikuláš: Vybrané problémy hudební sociologie. 1. vyd. Olomouc. Vydavatelství Univerzity Palackého 1993. 96 s. 
Burešová, Alena: Pavel Bořkovec. Olomouc. Votobia 1995, 224 s. 
Burešová, Alena: Cantus Iuventutis. 1. vyd. Olomouc. Vydavatelství Univerzity Palackého 2002. 140 s. 
Černý, Miroslav K.: Hudba antických kultur. 1. vyd. Olomouc. Vydavatelství Univerzity Palackého 1995. 181 s. 
Černý, Miroslav K.: Kapitoly z metodologie hudební vědy. 1. vyd. Olomouc. Vydavatelství Univerzity Palackého 1998. 103 s. 
Černý, Miroslav K.: Nástin vývoje symfonie. 1. vyd. Olomouc. Vydavatelství Univerzity Palackého 2002.
 2001. 234 s. 
Havelka, František: Muzikolog a počítač (Úvod do studia počítačové editace hudby). Olomouc. Vydavatelství Univerzity Palackého 1998. 120 s. 
Hudec, Vladimír: Zdeněk Fibich. Tematický katalog. Editio Bärenreiter, Praha, 2001, 850 s., 
Jiránek, Jaroslav: Hudební sémantika a sémiotika. 1. vyd. Olomouc. Vydavatelství Univerzity Palackého 1996. 139 s. 
Jiránek, Jaroslav: Zdeněk Fibich. Druhé, přepracované vyd. Praha. AMU 2000. 307 s. 
Jurková, Zuzana: Kapitoly o mimoevropské hudbě. 1. vyd. Olomouc. Vydavatelství Univerzity Palackého 1996, 73 s. . Druhé, doplněné  opravené vydání Olomouc, Vydavatelství Univerzity Palackého, 2001. 107 s. .
Křupková, Lenka: Studie ze života a díla Vítězslava Nováka. 1. vyd. Olomouc. Vydavatelství Univerzity Palackého 2006, 224 s. .
Navrátil, Miloslav Dějiny hudby. Přehled evropských dějin hudby (rozšířené vydání). Olomouc. Votobia 2003. 367 s. 
Poledňák, Ivan; Fukač, Jiří: Úvod do studia hudební vědy. Olomouc. Vydavatelství Univerzity Palackého 1995. 146 s. . Druhé, doplněné  opravené vydání Olomouc, Vydavatelství Univerzity Palackého, 2001. 260 s. .
Poledňák, Ivan: Úvod do problematiky hudby jazzového okruhu. Olomouc. Vydavatelství Univerzity Palackého 2000. 231 s. 
Poledňák, Ivan: Vášeň rozumu. Skladatel Jan Klusák - člověk, osobnost, tvůrce. Olomouc. Vydavatelství Univerzity Palackého 2004. 414 s. 
Poledňák, Ivan et ali: Proměny hudby v měnícím se světě. Olomouc. Vydavatelství Univerzity Palackého 2007. 352 s. 
Sehnal, Jiří: Pavel Josef Vejvanovký a biskupská kapela v Kroměříži. Kroměříž, Muzeum Kroměřížska 1993. 112 s. .
Sehnal, Jiří: Musik des 17. Jahrhunderts und Pavel Vejvanovský. Red. J. Sehnal. Brno 1994. .
Sehnal, Jiří: Caroli de Liechtenstein - Castelcorno episcopi Olomucensis operum artis musicae collectio Cremsirii reservata. Composuerunt Sehnal J. et Pešková J. Pragae 1998. 979 s. Artis musicae antiquioris catalogorum series Vol. V/1 - 2. , .
Sehnal, Jiří: Barokní varhanářství na Moravě. Díl 1. Varhanáři. Brno 2003. 171 s. 
Sehnal, Jiří: Barokní varhanářství na Moravě. Díl II. Varhany. Brno 2004, 293 s.,  
Sehnal, Jiří; Vysloužil, Jiří: Dějiny hudby na Moravě. Vlastivěda moravská - nová řada, sv. 12. Brno 2001. 311 s. 
Vičarová, Eva: Rakouská vojenská hudba v 19. století  Olomouc. Univerzita Palackého v Olomouci, Olomouc 2002. 178 s. 
Vičar, Jan: Hudební kritika a popularizace hudby. 1. vyd. Praha, Filozofická fakulta Univerzity Karlovy - Koniasch Latin Press 1997. 184 s. 
Vičar, Jan: Imprints: Essays on Czech Music and Aesthetics. Vydavatelství Univerzity Palackého Olomouc, Togga Praha, 2005. 251 s.
Vičar, Jan; Dykast, Roman Hudební estetika. Praha. Akademie múzických umění 1998. 184 s.  spisem Jiřího Sehnala Varhany na Moravě.

Editions
Křupková, Lenka Korespondence Vítězslava Nováka v letech 1890-1905. Elektronická edice korespondence. In: http://www.musicologica.cz 2004
Sehnal, Jiří Heinrich Ignaz Franz Biber: Instrumentalwerke handschriftlicher Überlieferung, Graz 1997, IX, 116 S. DTÖ 151.
Sehnal, Jiří Adam Michna z Otradovic: Svatoroční muzika. Praha 2001. AMC Vol. 5
Sehnal, Jiří Heinrich Ignaz Franz Biber: Ausgewählte Werke 2. Salzburg 2001. XVI, 76 s. DMS Bd. 10
Sehnal, Jiří Adam Michna z Otradovic: Officium Vespertinum - Psalmi 1. Praha 2003. AMC Vol. 6
Sehnal, Jiří Adam Michna z Otradovic: Officium Vespertinum - Psalmi 2. Praha 2003. AMC Vol. 7
Sehnal, Jiří; Vičar, Jan et ali: Philipp Jakob Rittler: Requiem Claudiae Imperatricis. Olomouc 1998. ISMN: M-706513-02-7
Sehnal, Jiří; Bělský, Vratislav: Adam Michna z Otradovic: Officium Vespertinum - Compositiones ad honorem B.M.V. - Falsi burdoni. Editio Bärenreiter 2004. 15, 58 stran, Adam Michna z Otradovic, Compositiones vol. 8 ISMN: M-2601-0300-9.
Silná, Ingrid Francesco Carlo Müller: Messa in A di Dominica pro tempore Nativitatis vel alio. Olomouc 2007. .

Periodicals and other publications
Kritické edice hudebních památek (Critical Editions of Musical Documents; ed. Jan Vičar   Alena Burešová). Olomouc, Vydavatelství Univerzity Palackého 1996. 172 s.
Kritické edice hudebních památek II  (Critical Editions of Musical Documents II; ed. Jan Vičar   Božena Felgrová). Olomouc, Vydavatelství Univerzity Palackého 1998. 233 s.
Kritické edice hudebních památek III. Korespondence jako muzikologický pramen a problém (Critical Editions of Musical Documents III; editor Stanislav Tesař). Olomouc, Vydavatelství Univerzity Palackého 1999. 166 s.
Kritické edice hudebních památek IV. Digitalizace památek - metoda jejich ochrany a prezentace? Katalogizace jako teoretický a praktický problém muzikologické dokumentace. (Critical Editions of Musical Documents IV; editor Stanislav Tesař). Masarykova univerzita v Brně a Univerzita Palackého v Olomouci. Olomouc 2001. 194 s.
Kritické edice hudebních památek V. Varhany a jejich funkce v Čechách a na Moravě 1600-2000. In honorem Jiří Sehnal.(Critical Editions of Musical Documents V; editor Jan Vičar). Olomouc, Vydavatelství Univerzity Palackého 2003. 171 s.
Kritické edice hudebních památek VI. Hudba v Olomouci - historie a současnost I. In honorem Pavel Čotek. (Critical Editions of Musical Documents VI; editor Eva Vičarová). Olomouc, Vydavatelství Univerzity Palackého 2003. 170 s.
Kritické edice hudebních památek VII. Hudba v Olomouci - historie a současnost II. In honorem Robert Smetana. (Critical Editions of Musical Documents VII; editor Alena Burešová). Olomouc, Vydavatelství Univerzity Palackého 2004. 400 s.
Musicologica Olomucensia I (editor Jan Vičar). Acta Universitatis Palackianae Olomucensis Facultas Philosophica, Philosophica - Aesthetica 12. Olomouc, Vydavatelství Univerzity Palackého (Palacký University Publishers), 1993. 146 s.
Musicologica Olomucensia II (editor Jan Vičar). Acta Universitatis Palackianae Olomucensis Philosophica, Philosophica - Aesthetica 14. Olomouc, Vydavatelství Univerzity Palackého 1995. 142 s.
Musicologica Olomucensia III. In honorem Jaroslav Jiránek (ed. Jan Vičar a Lenka Křupková). Acta Universitatis Palackianae Olomucensis Facultas Philosophica, Philosophica-Aesthetica 15. Olomouc, Vydavatelství Univerzity Palackého 1997. 180 s.
Musicologica Olomucensia IV. De consortiis musicis et musicorum musicaeque in Bohemia Moraviaque circulatione 1600-1900 - fontium litterarumque status (Musical Institutions and the Circulation of Music and Musicians in Bohemia and Moravia, 1600-1900 - the State of the Sources and the Current Literature) (ed. Jan Vičar  Eva Slavíčková). Acta Universitatis Palackianae Olomucensis Facultas Philosophica, Philosophica-Aesthetica 17. Olomouc, Vydavatelství Univerzity Palackého 1998. 230 s.
Musicologica Olomucensia V (ed. Ivan Poledňák a Helena Chaloupková). Acta Universitatis Palackianae Olomucensis, Facultas Philosophica, Philosophica-Aesthetica 19., 2000, 222 s. (ISSN 1212-1193)
Musicologica Olomucensia VI. In honorem Ivan Poledňák (ed. Jan Vičar a František Havelka). Acta Universitatis Palackianae Olomucensis Facultas Philosophica, Philosophica-Aesthetica 20 - 2001, 264 s. (ISSN 1212-1193)
Musicologica Olomucensia VII. (ed. Paul Christiansen). Acta Universitatis Palackianae Olomucensis Facultas Philosophica, Philosophica-Aesthetica 28 - 2005, 147 s. (ISSN 1212-1193)
Musicologica Olomucensia VIII. (ed. Jiří Kopecký). Acta Universitatis Palackianae Olomucensis Facultas Philosophica, Philosophica-Aesthetica 31 - 2006, 236 s. (ISSN 1212-1193)
Musicologica Olomucensia IX. In honorem Ivan Poledňák (ed. Lenka Křupková). Acta Universitatis Palackianae Olomucensis Facultas Philosophica, Philosophica-Aesthetica 33 - 2007, 274 s. (ISSN 1212-1193) Hudba v Olomuci a na střední Moravě I. In memoriam Vladimír Hudec (ed. Eva Vičarová). Olomouc. Vydavatelství Univerzity Palackého 2007. 337 s., součástí publikace je hudební DVD

External links
Department of Musicology PhF PU Ol
Philosophical Faculty Palacky University Olomouc
Palacky University Olomouc
 MusicOlomouc

Humanities education
Musicology
Music schools in the Czech Republic
Palacký University Olomouc
1946 establishments in Czechoslovakia
1992 establishments in Czechoslovakia
Educational institutions established in 1946
Educational institutions established in 1992